The 1996 Houston Cougars football team, also known as the Houston Cougars, Houston, or UH represented the University of Houston in the 1996 NCAA Division I-A football season.  It was the 51st year of season play for Houston and the first season as a member of Conference USA following the breakup of the Southwest Conference. The team was coached by Kim Helton.  The team split its home games between the Houston Astrodome and Robertson Stadium. The Cougars became inaugural conference champions and were invited to the 1996 Liberty Bowl, their first bowl game since 1988. Houston won their conference for the first time since 1984.

Schedule
Houston did not play Rice for the first time since 1970.

Roster

References

Houston
Houston Cougars football seasons
Conference USA football champion seasons
Houston Cougars football
Houston Cougars football